The 1985–86 Northeast Louisiana Indians men's basketball team represented the University of Louisiana at Monroe in the 1985–86 NCAA Division I men's basketball season. The Indiana, led by head coach Mike Vining, played their home games at Fant–Ewing Coliseum in Monroe, Louisiana, as members of the Southland Conference. They finished the season 20–10, 9–3 in Southland play to win the regular season conference title. They followed that success by winning the Southland tournament to earn an automatic bid to the NCAA tournament as No. 13 seed in the West region. Northeast Louisiana fell to No. 4 seed UNLV in the opening round, 74–51.

Roster

Schedule and results

|-
!colspan=9 style=| Regular season

|-
!colspan=9 style=| Southland tournament

|-
!colspan=9 style=| NCAA Tournament

Awards and honors
Bobby Jenkins – Southland Conference Player of the Year

References

Louisiana–Monroe Warhawks men's basketball seasons
Northeast Louisiana
Northeast Louisiana
Louisiana-Monroe Warhawks men's basketball
Louisiana-Monroe Warhawks men's basketball